Aphnaeus erikssoni, the Eriksson's highflier, is a butterfly in the family Lycaenidae. It is found in Angola, Namibia, Zambia, the Democratic Republic of the Congo, Tanzania, Malawi, Mozambique and Zimbabwe. The habitat consists of savanna and open woodland.

Adults of subspecies A. e. barnesi have been recorded feeding from the flowers of  Brachystegia trees and sucking from damp spots.

The larvae feed on Julbernardia globiflora and Burkea africana. They are associated with ants of the genus Crematogaster.

Subspecies
A. e. erikssoni (southern Angola, Namibia: Caprivi, north-western Zambia, Democratic Republic of the Congo: south-east to Lualaba)
A. e. barnesi Stempffer, 1954 (eastern Zimbabwe)
A. e. kiellandi Stempffer, 1972 (Tanzania: south-west to the Mpanda and Kigoma districts)
A. e. mashunae Stempffer, 1954 (Zimbabwe: Harare area)
A. e. rex Aurivillius, 1909 (Malawi, south-eastern Tanzania, north-eastern Zambia, Mozambique)

References

Seitz, A. Die Gross-Schmetterlinge der Erde 13: Die Afrikanischen Tagfalter. Plate XIII 69 d, h ssp. rex Aurivillius, 1909

Butterflies described in 1891
Aphnaeus
Butterflies of Africa